Dmitry Yurievich Malikov (born 29 January 1970) is a Russian actor, composer, singer and a recent record producer.

Early life
Dmitry Malikov, who goes by his nickname Dima (Дима), was born in Moscow, Soviet Union. His mother, Lyudmila Mikhailovna Vyunkova, was a dancer, and his father,  Yuriy Fedorovich Malikov (Юрий Федорович Маликов), was part of a band called Samotsvety (Самоцветы). This combination of parental talent had a large influence in his becoming a musician. In the early 70s, Samotsvety became one of the most popular groups in the USSR, selling several million records. His younger sister, Inna Malikova (Инна Маликова), is also a recording artist.

School and childhood
As his father was often on tour, Malikov was brought up by his grandparents.

Music
In 1985, Malikov performed two songs at the Soundtrack Concert (звуковая дорожка / Zvukovaya Dorozhka) organized by the popular Russian newspaper Moskovsky Komsomolets (Московский Комсомолец), which was his first major performance. 

In 1994, Malikov released his first album, Until Tomorrow (До завтра / Do Zavtra), which had been released twice previously, once in 1993 as With You (С тобой / S Toboy) and in 1992, as Searching Soul (Поиски Души / Poiski Dushi). This was a compilation of his early hits, and the albums were nearly identical. He also released a second album in 1994, titled Come to Me (Иди ко мне / Idi Ko Mne). In 1996, Malikov released an album called Fear of Flying (Страх полета / Strah Polyeta).

The 1998 release of My Distant Star (Звезда моя далекая / Zvezda Moya Dalyokaya) saw one of his most successful singles, "You're the Only One" (Ты одна, ты такая / Ti Odna, Ti Takaya). 2000's Beads (Бисер / Biser) continued Malikov's progression as an artist, with the inclusion of several hard-hitting tracks (including the title track) favoring harder synth sounds. 

A compilation of instrumentals, 2001's Game (Игра / Igra), showcased Malikov's creativity. The album contained many ethereal arrangements reminiscent of Fear of Flying. While all songs showcased his pianistic prowess, one in particular, "Wanderer" (Странник / Strannik) ends with a chilling classical climax. Perhaps the most innovative song is the 1955 standard, "Moscow Nights" (Подмосковные вечера / Podmoskovnye Vechera), backed by jazz drums and a chorus of crickets chirping in time. 2002 saw a return to Malikov's thoroughly-enjoyable pop songwriting with Love Story.

Pianomania 

In 2006 Malikov brought to life Pianomania (PIANOMANIЯ) – a mixture of instrumental music, dance shows and colorful performances. In December 2010, in France, Dmitry Malikov presented a show of classical music Symphonic Mania - creative development and a new vision of the project PIANOMANIYA.

Awards
Meritorious Artist (Deserved Artist) of Russia (Заслуженный артист России) (22 November 1999)
World's Best-Selling Recording Artist of the Year category - World Music Awards (1995)
People's Gold Grammophone (народной "Золотой граммофон") - Russian Radio (1996, 1997, 1998, 1999,2001,2002,2003,2005,2015,2019)
Hundred-Percent Hit (Стопудовый хит) - Hit FM (Хит-FM) (1998, 1999, 2000)

|-
! colspan="3" style="background: cyan;" | World Music Awards
|-

|-

Discography

DVDs

Filmography
 1992 — Увидеть Париж и умереть — Юра Орехов
 1996 — Старые песни о главном 2 — physics teacher
 1997 — Старые песни о главном 3 — Аркадий from the "Start" / singer at the disco
 2001 — Старые песни о главном. Постскриптум
 2005—2006 — Моя прекрасная няня (103 серия «Любовь и супчик», 133 серия «Долгожданная свадьба!») — камео
 2006 — Здрасьте, я ваше папо!
 2008 — И всё-таки я люблю… (soundtrack)
 (September 12, 2012 – September 2016) Spokoynoy nochi, malyshi! ("") (Presenter, himself)

References

External links
Official Dmitry Malikov website
Dmitry Malikov at Peoples.ru

1970 births
Living people
Singers from Moscow
20th-century Russian singers
21st-century Russian singers
Russian singer-songwriters
Moscow Conservatory alumni
Russian male singer-songwriters
People's Artists of Russia
Russian composers
Russian male composers
Soviet composers
Soviet male composers
Honored Artists of the Russian Federation
Russian television presenters
Russian record producers
20th-century Russian male singers
21st-century Russian male singers
Winners of the Golden Gramophone Award